AB Aurigae is a young Herbig Ae star in the Auriga constellation. It is located at a distance of approximately 531 light years from the Sun based on stellar parallax. This pre-main-sequence star has a stellar classification of A0Ve, matching an A-type main-sequence star with emission lines in the spectrum.

This star is known for hosting a dust disk that may harbour a condensing planet or brown dwarf. The star could host a possible substellar companion in wide orbit. The star is part of the young Taurus-Auriga association, which is located in the Taurus Molecular Cloud. The star itself may recently have encountered a dense cloudlet, which disrupted its debris disk and produced an additional reflection nebula.

Planetary system
In 2017 scientists used the Atacama Large Millimeter/submillimeter Array (ALMA) to take an image of the protoplanetary disk around AB Aurigae. The image showed a dusty disk which has a radius of about 120 astronomical units and a distinct "gap". Inside this gap gaseous spiral arms are detected in CO.

Oppenheimer et al. (2008) observed an annulus feature in AB Aurigae's dust disk between 43 and 302 AU from the star, a region never seen before. An azimuthal gap in an annulus of dust at a radius of 102 AU would suggest the formation of at least one small body at an orbital distance of nearly 100 AU. Such an object could turn out to be either a massive planetary companion or more likely a brown dwarf companion, in both cases located at nearly 100 AU from the bright star. So far the object is unconfirmed.

Observations with ALMA found two gaseous spiral arms inside the disk. These are best explained by an unseen planet with a semimajor axis of about 60–80 au. An additional planet with a semimajor axis of 30 au and with a large pitch angle compared to the disk (likely higher inclination) could explain the emptiness of the inner dusty disk. The outer planet was still not detected as in 2022, putting an upper limit on is mass at 3–4 , inconsistent with the spiral structures observed in the disk. The planet-like clump observed in April 2022 at projected separation 93 AU from star, may be either an accretion disk around newly formed planet or the unstable disk region currently transforming into the planet. The planet observation was confirmed in July 2022.

Gallery

References

Further reading

External links
 
 Image AB Aurigae
 
 
 
 
 
 
 
 
Archived:
 
 
 

Herbig Ae/Be stars
A-type main-sequence stars
Planetary systems with one confirmed planet
Circumstellar disks

Auriga (constellation)
Durchmusterung objects
031293
022910
Aurigae, AB